Francisco Miguel Varela Martín (born 26 October 1994) is a Spanish footballer who plays as a left back for Linares Deportivo.

Formed at Betis, where he made 14 La Liga appearances, he played 71 games and scored two goals in Segunda División for that team, Oviedo and Rayo Majadahonda. He also had a brief spell in the Portuguese Primeira Liga with Belenenses SAD.

Club career

Betis
Born in Atarfe, Granada, Andalusia, Varela graduated from Real Betis' youth setup, after starting it out at neighbouring Granada CF. He made his senior debuts with the reserves in the 2011–12 campaign, in Segunda División B.

On 4 May 2013 Varela was called up to the main squad for a La Liga match against FC Barcelona, but was an unused substitute in the eventual 2–4 away loss a day later. He played his first match as a professional on 27 February 2014, replacing Rubén Castro in the 81st minute of a 2–0 away win against FC Rubin Kazan in that season's UEFA Europa League.

Varela renewed his contract with the Verdiblancos on 24 July 2014, running until 2016. He made his league debut on 23 November, starting in a 1–2 home loss against Deportivo Alavés in the Segunda División championship.

On 5 May 2015, Varela renewed his contract for a further season, and subsequently achieved promotion to La Liga after appearing in 22 matches. He made his debut in the category on 27 September, starting in a 2–1 away win against Sporting de Gijón.

Oviedo and Majadahonda
On 14 July 2016, Varela signed a two-year contract with Real Oviedo in the second level, after being deemed surplus to requirements by new manager Gus Poyet. He scored his only goal for the Asturians on 11 December with a late direct free kick nine minutes after replacing Néstor Susaeta in a 2–1 loss at Real Zaragoza, but later lost his starting place under manager Fernando Hierro and ended his season in April 2017 to undergo surgery on his left knee.

Varela moved to fellow league team CF Rayo Majadahonda on 6 July 2018. He played 26 times as the newly promoted side went straight back down, and scored once to open a 4–3 loss at Oviedo on his return to the Estadio Carlos Tartiere on 4 June 2019; the loss in the penultimate game of the season confirmed their relegation.

B-SAD
On 30 July 2019, after Rayo's relegation, Varela moved abroad for the first time by signing for Portugal's Belenenses SAD on a three-year deal. He made his debut in the Primeira Liga in the season opener on 9 August, starting in a goalless draw at Portimonense SC. He lost his place to the unrelated youngster Nilton Varela after Petit became the manager, could not find a new suitor in the January 2020 transfer window, and following a shoulder operation in his homeland in March did not return to Lisbon again.

Return to Spain
In January 2021, Varela went back to his country, signing for third-tier San Fernando CD. He spent the following season in the new league at the same level, the Primera División RFEF, split between Extremadura UD and UE Costa Brava who were both relegated; he scored a career-best four goals, all for the latter club, including two in a 3–0 home win over UCAM Murcia CF on 7 May 2022.

On 15 July 2022, Varela signed for another team in the same league, CD Alcoyano. The following 12 June, he made another mid-season switch, to Linares Deportivo.

Statistics

References

External links

1994 births
Living people
Sportspeople from the Province of Granada
Footballers from Andalusia
Spanish footballers
Association football defenders
La Liga players
Segunda División players
Segunda División B players
Tercera División players
Primera Federación players
Betis Deportivo Balompié footballers
Real Betis players
Real Oviedo players
CF Rayo Majadahonda players
San Fernando CD players
Extremadura UD footballers
UE Costa Brava players
CD Alcoyano footballers
Linares Deportivo footballers
Primeira Liga players
Belenenses SAD players
Spanish expatriate footballers
Spanish expatriate sportspeople in Portugal
Expatriate footballers in Portugal
Spain youth international footballers